Izzatullo Halimov (formerly: Yakhak-Yust) is a jamoat in Tajikistan. It is located in Nurobod District, one of the Districts of Republican Subordination. The jamoat has a total population of 8,035 (2015).

References

Populated places in Districts of Republican Subordination
Jamoats of Tajikistan